Brian McGowan may refer to:
 Brian McGowan (businessman) (born 1945), co-founder of Williams Holdings
 Brian McGowan (footballer) (born 1938), former Australian rules footballer
 Brian McGowan (politician) (1935–1994), former member of the New South Wales Legislative Assembly